The 1982–83 UEFA Cup was the 12th edition of the UEFA Cup. It was won by Belgian club Anderlecht on 2–1 aggregate over Portuguese club Benfica.

Association team allocation
A total of 64 teams from 31 UEFA member associations participate in the 1982–83 UEFA Cup. The association ranking based on the UEFA country coefficients is used to determine the number of participating teams for each association:
Associations 1-3 each have four teams qualify.
Associations 4-9 each have three teams qualify.
Associations 10-22 (except Wales) each have two teams qualify.
Associations 23-33 (Albania did not play) each have one team qualify.

Association ranking
For the 1982–83 UEFA Cup, the associations are allocated places according to their 1981 UEFA country coefficients, which takes into account their performance in European competitions from 1976–77 to 1980–81. As Albania did not play, Italy obtained a special place.

Teams
The labels in the parentheses show how each team qualified for competition:
TH: Title holders
CW: Cup winners
CR: Cup runners-up
LC: League Cup winners
2nd, 3rd, 4th, 5th, 6th, etc.: League position
P-W: End-of-season European competition play-offs winners

First round 

|}

First leg

Second leg

Sevilla won 6–1 on aggregate.

Bohemians won 7–1 on aggregate.

1–1 on aggregate; KSC Lokeren won on away goals.

Corvinul Hunedoara won 4–1 on aggregate.

Kaiserslautern won 6–0 on aggregate.

Saint-Étienne won 4–1 on aggregate.

FK Sarajevo won 6–4 on aggregate.

Hajduk Split won 8–1 on aggregate.

Baník Ostrava won 4–1 on aggregate.

Śląsk Wrocław won 3–2 on aggregate.

3–3 on aggregate; Viking won on away goals.

Anderlecht won 6–1 on aggregate.

IK Brage won 4–3 on aggregate.

2–2 on aggregate; IFK Norrköping won on away goals.

Bordeaux won 6–3 on aggregate.

3–3 on aggregate; Werder Bremen won on away goals.

Ferencvárosi won 3–2 on aggregate.

HFC Haarlem won 5–4 on aggregate.

2–2 on aggregate; PAOK won on away goals.

Zürich won 3–2 on aggregate.

Benfica won 4–2 on aggregate.

Roma won 4–3 on aggregate.

Rangers won 2–0 on aggregate.

Dundee United won 3–1 on aggregate.

2–2 on aggregate; Napoli won on away goals.

Servette won 4–0 on aggregate.

Spartak Moscow won 8–4 on aggregate.

Universitatea Craiova won 3–2 on aggregate.

Valencia won 2–1 on aggregate.

Porto won 3–0 on aggregate.

Shamrock Rovers won 7–0 on aggregate.

Köln won 6–0 on aggregate.

Second round 

|}

First leg

See also Luzhniki disaster

Second leg

Universitatea Craiova won 5–0 on aggregate.FK Sarajevo won 8–4 on aggregate.Valencia won 1–0 on aggregate. Bohemians won 4–0 on aggregate.Werder Bremen won 8–2 on aggregate.1–1 on aggregate. Roma won 4–2 on penalties.Benfica won 4–1 on aggregate.Bordeaux won 5–4 on aggregate.FC Zürich won 2–1 on aggregate.Kaiserslautern won 4–1 on aggregate.Köln won 6–2 on aggregate.Spartak Moscow won 5–1 on aggregate.Dundee United won 3–1 on aggregate.Sevilla won 4–2 on aggregate.Anderlecht won 6–3 on aggregate.Servette won 7–1 on aggregate.Third round

|}

First leg

Second legUniversitatea Craiova won 2–1 on aggregate.Roma won 2–1 on aggregate.Anderlecht won 6–2 on aggregate.Bohemians won 4–3 on aggregate.Valencia won 2–0 on aggregate.Dundee United won 3–2 on aggregate.Kaiserslautern won 4–1 on aggregate.Benfica won 5–1 on aggregate.Quarter-finals

|}

First leg

Second leg3–3 on aggregate; Universitatea Craiova won on away goals.Anderlecht won 5–2 on aggregate.Bohemians won 1–0 on aggregate.Benfica won 3–2 on aggregate.Semi-finals

|}

First leg

Second leg1–1 on aggregate; Benfica won on away goals.Anderlecht won 4–1 on aggregateFinal

First leg

Second legAnderlecht won 2–1 on aggregate.''

Top goalscorers

References

External links
1982–83 All matches UEFA Cup – season at UEFA website
Official Site
Results at RSSSF.com
 All scorers 1982–83 UEFA Cup according to protocols UEFA
1982/83 UEFA Cup - results and line-ups (archive)

 
2
UEFA Cup seasons